"The Chipmunk Song (Christmas Don't Be Late)" is a novelty Christmas song written by Ross Bagdasarian (under the stage name of David Seville) in 1958. Bagdasarian sang and recorded the song, varying the tape speeds to produce high-pitched "chipmunk" voices, with the vocals credited to Alvin and the Chipmunks, Seville's cartoon virtual band. The song won three Grammy Awards in 1958, for Best Comedy Performance, Best Children's Recording, and Best Engineered Record (non-classical).

Commercial performance 
The song was very successful, reaching No. 1 on the Billboard Hot 100 Pop Singles chart, becoming The Chipmunks' first (and only), as well as David Seville's second and final, No. 1 single. It had the distinction of being the only Christmas record to reach No. 1 on the same chart until Mariah Carey’s "All I Want for Christmas Is You" did so 61 years later in 2019. The single sold 4.5 million copies in seven weeks, according to Ross Bagdasarian Jr. It eventually sold 12 million copies. Before the song's success, "The Chipmunk Song" was featured on American Bandstand's "Rate-A-Record" segment and received the lowest possible rating of 35 across the board.

Between 1958 and 1962, the single re-entered the Hot 100 several times, peaking at No. 41 in 1958, No. 45 in 1960, and No. 39 in 1962. (Starting in 1963, Billboard would list recurrent Christmas songs on a separate chart.) The song charted on the Hot Digital Songs for the first time in 2005, peaking at No. 35.

With the release and popularity of the film Alvin and the Chipmunks in December 2007, "The Chipmunk Song" re-entered the Billboard Hot 100 at No. 70. At the same time, a remixed version of the song that appears on the Chipmunks' 2007 album (and soundtrack to the film) Alvin and the Chipmunks: Original Motion Picture Soundtrack, peaked at No. 66 and was credited as "The Chipmunk Song (Christmas Don't Be Late) (2007 Version)".

As of December 25, 2011, Nielsen SoundScan estimated total sales of two versions of the digital track by The Chipmunks at 867,000 downloads, placing it third on the list of all-time best-selling Christmas/holiday digital singles in SoundScan history (behind Mariah Carey's 1994 hit single "All I Want for Christmas Is You" and Trans-Siberian Orchestra's 1996 track "Christmas Eve/Sarajevo 12/24").

Track listing

Original 1958 release

1959 reissue

1961 reissue

Adaptation in other media 
The song was adapted into a musical segment in 1961 for The Alvin Show. The segment depicts Alvin sifting through various presents to find a hula hoop, even as he reluctantly sings along with the other Chipmunks. At the end of the song, Seville rewards Simon and Theodore with toy planes and Alvin with his hula hoop. The subsequent argument about singing the song again ends abruptly with their Christmas tree falling over, and Seville and the Chipmunks emerge from the mess to wish the viewers a merry Christmas. This segment was released on DVD and Blu-Ray in March 2015 as part of a three-episode set of The Alvin Show.
The song was resurrected for the 1981 NBC Christmas television special A Chipmunk Christmas. A depressed Alvin sings along flatly at first (much like the 1958 original), but then leaves the studio to give away his harmonica to a sick boy. Though Seville starts to resume recording the song without Alvin, Alvin returns in the nick of time to sing the song with the others.
The song was later featured in an episode of the NBC Saturday morning series Alvin and the Chipmunks (1983–1990), in the episode "Merry Christmas, Mr. Carroll". In that version, Alvin is taken by Dave (as the Spirit of Christmas Past) to his old house, a cabin lodge where he saw Dave and younger versions of himself, Simon and Theodore. There, it was revealed that Dave wrote the song (called "The Christmas Song" in this episode), because it was inspired by the gifts that the young Chipmunks gave him (which were an eraser, a pencil and a piece of paper).
The song was prominently featured in the 2007 computer animated film Alvin and the Chipmunks. A scene similar to that of the original segment on The Alvin Show appears with Jason Lee portraying Dave Seville. The film also features the original track by Ross Bagdasarian Sr., a remake with Ross Jr as Dave, and a new rock mix with Lee as Dave, both of which appear on the film's soundtrack. The original track is played briefly during a flashback in Alvin and the Chipmunks: The Road Chip.
The original recording has been used in the feature films Rocky IV (1985), Look Who's Talking Now (1993), Donnie Brasco (1997), Almost Famous (2000), Whiskey Tango Foxtrot (2016) and The Fate of the Furious (2017).
The Chipmunks performed a smooth jazz version of the song with Kenny G on the saxophone for their 1994 album A Very Merry Chipmunk. They also performed a duet version with Jaci Velasquez for her 2001 album Christmas in which Alvin tries to flirt with Jaci in Spanish and changes the lyric "I want a hula hoop" to "I want a date with you."
On a Christmas episode of The King of Queens, the character Doug Heffernan says it's his favorite Christmas song, but his father-in-law Arthur Spooner despises it, chastising Alvin for his delays in the song, saying it "throws the other chipmunks off". However, Arthur soon takes a great liking to the song and continually plays it throughout the episode, much to Doug and his wife Carrie's annoyance.
Justin Timberlake (as Dave), along with Andy Samberg (as Simon), Fred Armisen (as Theodore) and Bill Hader (as Alvin) covered the song during the monologue section for the Christmas episode of Saturday Night Lives 32nd season.
In the 2009 film Ice Age: Dawn of the Dinosaurs, the song is briefly sung by Crash and Eddie in a high pitch voice of both helium and gas.
Norah Jones recorded a cover of the song for her 2021 Christmas album, I Dream of Christmas.
It is sung by the cast in the season 3 episode of Mythic Quest, “The 12 Hours of Christmas”.

See also 
List of Hot 100 number-one singles of 1958 (U.S.)

References

1958 songs
Alvin and the Chipmunks songs
American Christmas songs
Billboard Hot 100 number-one singles
Cashbox number-one singles
Songs written by Ross Bagdasarian
Christmas novelty songs
Grammy Award for Best Comedy Album
Grammy Award for Best Engineered Album, Non-Classical
Liberty Records singles